The night herons are medium-sized herons, 58–65 cm, in the genera Nycticorax, Nyctanassa, and Gorsachius. The genus name Nycticorax derives from the Greek for “night raven” and refers to the largely nocturnal feeding habits of this group of birds, and the croaking crow-like, almost like a barking sound, call of the best known species, the black-crowned night heron.

In Europe, night heron is often used to refer to the black-crowned night heron, since it is the only member of the genus in that continent.

Adults are short-necked, short-legged, and stout herons with a primarily brown or grey plumage, and, in most, a black crown. Young birds are brown, flecked with white. At least some of the extinct Mascarenes taxa appear to have retained this juvenile plumage in adult birds.

Night herons nest alone or in colonies, on platforms of sticks in a group of trees, or on the ground in protected locations such as islands or reedbeds. 3-8 eggs are laid.

Night herons stand still at the water's edge, and wait to ambush prey, mainly at night. They primarily eat small fish, crustaceans, frogs, aquatic insects, and small mammals. During the day, they rest in trees or bushes.

There are seven extant species. The genus Nycticorax has suffered more than any other Pelecaniformes genus from extinction, mainly because of their capability to colonize small, predator-free oceanic islands, and a tendency to evolve towards flightlessness.

Night herons breed mainly in southern and southeastern Europe and migrate across the Sahara to winter in central and west Africa.

Genera
 Nyctanassa
 Nycticorax
 Gorsachius

Gallery

References

Bird common names